Lao Ngam is a small town in Salavan Province, in southern Laos. It is the capital of Lao Ngam District. It is located along Route 20 to the northeast of  Houayhe on the way to Salavan.

References

External links
Maplandia
Populated places in Salavan Province